John Hayes Farmstead, also known as Cotton Press Farm and John Hayes House, is a historic home and farm located near Latta, Dillon County, South Carolina. The main house was built in 1791, later extensively renovated and expanded as an American Craftsman / Bungalow house in 1915.  It is still a working farm, producing tobacco, corn, grains, and soybeans, and in 1988 was recognized by the U.S. Department of Agriculture as a Bicentennial Farm. Also on the property are a sweet potato curing house, three barns, smokehouse, wash house, and pump house.

It was listed on the National Register of Historic Places in 2005.

References

Farms on the National Register of Historic Places in South Carolina
Houses completed in 1915
Houses in Dillon County, South Carolina
National Register of Historic Places in Dillon County, South Carolina